Adamjee Jute Mill was a jute mill in Bangladesh. It was established in Narayanganj in 1950 by the Adamjee Group. It was the second jute mill in East Pakistan (present day Bangladesh) after Bawa Jute Mill which was first Jute Mill in East Pakistan (Present day Bangladesh). Gradually, the mill became the largest jute mill in the world, exceeding the jute mills of Calcutta (now Kolkata), India, and Dundee, Scotland. The mills were nationalised after the independence of Bangladesh in 1972. It was operated by the Bangladesh Jute Mills Corporation before being closed down in 2002.

History
Adamjee Jute Mills was set up by Abdul Wahid Adamjee, Pakistan's foremost industrialist, and scion of the wealthiest family in the country. Initially, the said project was a partnership between the Adamjees and the PICIC (the government's industrial arm). The Adamjee family, however, soon took control of the project, and eventually built it into the largest jute mill in the world. In 1947 when India was partitioned there were 108 jute mills in Bengal but all were located in West Bengal which went to India. After the Independence of Pakistan, Muslim entrepreneurs were asked by the government of Pakistan to create proposals for a jute mill in East Bengal. The Adamjee Group in December 1949 presented the government of Pakistan a proposal for the jute plant. The capital for the mills were to be provided by Adamjee Brothers and the Pakistan Industrial Development Corporation 50-50 equally.  Siddhirganj was chosen as the site of mill due to the good river, road, and rail communication facilities.

The mill was established in December 1951. In May 1954 violence clashes took place between Bengali and Bihari workers at the jute mills. The Police and East Pakistan Rifles had been deployed to control the situation. In the clashes 90 were killed and 250 injured.

The Adamjee family lost control of the mill in 1971 during the Bangladesh Liberation War and it was nationalized after the Independence of Bangladesh. During the war Bengali workers were replaced by Bihari workers in the. After the war ended, the Bihari workers in the factory were protected by the Indian Army. It employed over 25,000 workers when it was closed on 30 June 2002. Since the nationalization the mill had accumulated 12 billion taka in losses.

Present

After a strong battle for survival, Adamjee Jute Mills was officially closed down in 2002 despite huge protests from local policy makers and political opponents. In that place, a new industrial zone has been installed, Adamjee Export Processing Zone.
In August 2011, the jute and textiles ministry sent a proposal to the prime minister of Bangladesh seeking her approval for rebuilding the second unit of the Adamjee Jute Mills in Narayanganj on 11 acres of land at an estimated cost of Tk 6087.2 million.

References

Textile companies of Bangladesh
Jute mills
Government-owned companies of Bangladesh
Organisations based in Narayanganj
Pakistani companies established in 1950
Renewable resource companies established in 1950
Manufacturing companies established in 1950
Jute industry of Bangladesh